The 2015–16 FC Karpaty Lviv season was the 53rd season in club history.

Review and events
On 17 June 2015 FC Karpaty gathered at club's base for medical inspection after vacations. On 23 June 2015 Karpaty went for two week long pre-season training camp in Slovenia with six friendly matches planned.

Competitions

Friendly matches

Pre-season

Mid-season

Winter break

Mid-season 2

Premier League

League table

Results summary

Matches

 Metalurh Zaporizhya was expelled from the competition during the season. Victory awarded to Karpaty Lviv

Ukrainian Cup

Squad information

Squad and statistics

Squad, appearances and goals

|-
|colspan="14"|Players featured for Karpaty but left before the end of the season:

|}

Goalscorers

Disciplinary record

Transfers

In

Out

Managerial changes

Sources

Karpaty Lviv
FC Karpaty Lviv seasons